This is a list of episodes for the third season of the 1970s TV series Charlie's Angels. Originally broadcast from September 13, 1978 to May 16, 1979 for a total of 24 episodes, this is the only season of the show not to feature a casting change. Original star Farrah Fawcett-Majors returned as Jill Munroe, appearing as a guest-star in three episodes.

The third season of Charlie's Angels would see a decline in viewing figures, dropping to #12 in the Nielsen ratings (from a high of #4 for the 1977–78 season). However, a fourth season was commissioned, with Shelley Hack replacing Kate Jackson (who departed the show at the end of this season) as Boston-detective Tiffany Welles.

Main cast
Kate Jackson as Sabrina Duncan (regular) 
Jaclyn Smith as Kelly Garrett (regular) 
Cheryl Ladd as Kris Munroe (regular) 
David Doyle as John Bosley (regular) 
John Forsythe as Charles "Charlie" Townsend (regular, voice only)

Notable guest stars
Farrah Fawcett-Majors as Jill Munroe (3 episodes)
Dick Sargent 
Stephen Collins
Mercedes McCambridge 
Jamie Lee Curtis
Anne Francis 
Audrey Landers
Dennis Cole
Gary Collins
Casey Kasem
Dean Martin
Scatman Crothers

Episodes

03
1978 American television seasons
1979 American television seasons